The Palm Trump International Hotel & Tower was a proposed skyscraper hotel and residential complex at the trunk of the Palm Jumeirah in Dubai. It was a joint venture between the Trump Organization and Dubai-based Nakheel, a government-owned company, and was announced on October 5, 2005. This building and other prestigious building projects throughout Dubai in late 2008 were never built, largely as a result of the global credit crunch.  

The project was officially cancelled by Nakheel in February 2011, and Nakheel opened Al Ittihad Park on the site in November 2012.

History
The Trump International Hotel & Tower was to be the first development from the Trump Organization in the Middle East. During the planning phase, Donald Trump stated "When I look at potential sites for real estate investment, I concentrate on 'location, location, location' – and this is the best location not only in Dubai but the whole of the Middle East." Christina Aguilera was booked to entertain guests at Trump's Los Angeles estate for the launch party on 23 August 2008.

Foundation work started in August 2007. In late November 2008, the Trump International Hotel & Tower was one of three "landmark projects" to be delayed by Nakheel, as it was struggling with the global financial crisis.

By February 2011, the status of the project was unclear. After the project was cancelled, Trump stated "[he and Nakheel] were smart and we got a little bit lucky that we never started that job" in a 2014 interview.

Design
Orlando-based HHCP Design International, Inc. (Managing Partner, Gregory Dungan, AIA) created the master plan for the Palm Jumeriah and the original design for the Trump International Hotel & Tower. The first design was nicknamed the "Golden Tulip" and featured a circular tower surrounded by four large golden petals attached to the sides. The Golden Tulip design won an award from the American Resort Development Association in 2006. Trump stated that he "wasn't a huge fan of [the Tulip design]".

Atkins Global was asked to evaluate the HHCP design in February 2006, and responded by revealing an updated concept design in November 2006. The senior design architect was Lee Morris. In Morris's design, two asymmetrical towers, linked at the 40th storey, form an archway over the Palm Jumeirah Monorail. The 62 storey-high towers feature stainless steel, glass, and stone facades, and a monorail station is located at the base of the two towers. The towers were planned to include a 378-room hotel (in the shorter tower) and a 397-apartment residential component (including two penthouse apartments, in the taller tower).

See also
 List of buildings in Dubai
 Trump International Hotel and Tower

References

External links
Trump International Hotel and Tower Dubai Official site
 
 

Unbuilt buildings and structures in Dubai
Donald Trump real estate
Nakheel Properties

Postmodern architecture in Dubai
  Trend Movers Dubai  One of the best moving and packing company provide quality work with affordable price